The Battle of Inlon River was a major engagement of the Nian Rebellion, occurring in 1867 CE.

References

19th-century rebellions
19th-century military history of China
1867 in China
Military history of Hubei
Peasant revolts
Inlon River
Inlon River
February 1867 events